Ahead of Time is a collection of science fiction stories by the American writer Henry Kuttner, first published in hardcover by Ballantine Books in 1953, with a paperback edition shortly afterwards. A British hardcover appeared in 1954, with a paperback following in 1961. Paperback reissues of both the UK and US editions appeared in the mid-1960s. A French translation appeared in 1962 and an Italian translation in 1971.

Contents
"Or Else"* (Amazing Stories, 1953)
"Home Is The Hunter"* (Galaxy, 1953)
"By These Presents" (Fantastic Stories, 1953)
"De Profundis"* (as "The Visitors", Science Fiction Quarterly, 1953)
"Camouflage"* (Astounding Stories, 1945) 
"Year Day" (original to collection)
"Ghost" (Astounding Stories, 1943)
"Shock"* (Astounding Stories, 1943)
"Pile of Trouble" (Thrilling Wonder Stories, 1948)
"Deadlock"* (Astounding Stories, 1942)

Stories marked with an asterisk (*) have been identified as collaborations by Kuttner and his wife, C. L. Moore.

Reception
Boucher and McComas, describing Kuttner as "one of s.f.'s most literate and intelligent storytellers", found the collection to be "just about as good as the modern magazine science-fantasy story can get". P. Schuyler Miller similarly reported that Ahead of Time was "as good as any of the short-story collections now being published". New Worlds reviewer Leslie Flood described Ahead of Time as "excellent".

References

External links
Index to Science Fiction Anthologies and Collections, Kuttner page

1953 short story collections
Books with cover art by Richard M. Powers
Science fiction short story collections
Ballantine Books books